The Little Mississippi River (Minnesota) is a river in Beltrami and Clearwater counties, Minnesota.  It has also been called the Piniddiwin River.

See also
List of rivers of Minnesota

References

Rivers of Minnesota